Heiata Brinkfield (born 4 April 1988) is a French Polynesian athlete specialising in Middle-distance running and the steeplechase who has represented French Polynesia at the Pacific Games and the Polynesian Championships in Athletics.

At the 2005 Polynesian Championships in Athletics she won silver in the 800 meters and 1,500 meters. At the 2007 South Pacific Games in Apia she won silver in the steeplechase and silver in the 1,500 meters. At the 2011 Pacific Games in Nouméa she won gold in the steeplechase. At the 2015 Pacific Games in Port Moresby she won bronze in the steeplechase.

References

Living people
1988 births
French Polynesian athletes